Ceratosoma pustulosum is a species of sea slug or dorid nudibranch, a marine gastropod mollusk in the family Chromodorididae.

Distribution 
This species was described from Timor.

Description
The type specimen of Ceratosoma pustulosum is in Muséum Nationale d'Histoire Naturelle, Paris and was studied by Pruvot-Fol. It is similar to Ceratosoma brevicaudatum but is unlikely to be the same species as this is a warm temperate species. It is currently not identifiable with any records since 1804.

References

Chromodorididae
Gastropods described in 1804
Taxa named by Georges Cuvier